Vereide is a village in Gloppen Municipality in Vestland county, Norway. The village is located along the central part of the eastern shore of the Gloppefjorden, along the European route E39 highway. Vereide Church is located in this village, right on the shore of the fjord.

There is some development right along the fjord, but due to the relatively steep hill, most development is located higher up on rather flat area further inland.  Nordfjord folkehøgskule, a Christian folk high school, is located in Vereide.

There are many old archaeological findings in the Vereide area, including burial mounds that date back to the year 300 AD.  In 1993, when construction was being done on the E39 highway through Vereide, an ancient burial site was discovered.  There is now a memorial stone and marker at that site.

References

Villages in Vestland
Gloppen